Joseph Tchao Kokou (born 1 January 1990 in Kpalimé) is a Togolese footballer, who plays for ASKO Kara.

International career
He is a member of the Togo national football team, who earned his first call up in June 2006 for the Qualification to the 2008 Africa Cup of Nations and presented the team at UEMOA Tournament 2007. He  made his debut on 6 November 2009 against Bahrain national football team.

References

1990 births
Living people
Togolese footballers
Togo international footballers
ASKO Kara players
People from Kpalimé
Association football goalkeepers
21st-century Togolese people